The Thai Ambassador in Santiago de Chile is the official representative of the Government in Bangkok to the Government of Chile and is concurrently accredited in San José, Costa Rica, Panama City and San Salvador.

List of representatives

References 

Chile
Thailand
Ambassadors of Thailand to Chile